The Farrukhabad–Kasganj Express is an Express train belonging to North Eastern Railway zone that runs between  and  in India. It is currently being operated with 15039/15040 train numbers on a daily basis.

Service

The 15039/Farrukhabad–Kasganj Express has an average speed of 43 km/hr and covers 108 km in 2h 30m. The 15040/Kasganj–Farrukhabad Express  has an average speed of 54 km/hr and covers 108 km in 2h.

Route and halts 

The important halts of the train are:

Coach composition

The train has standard ICF rakes with max speed of 110 kmph. The train consists of 12 coaches:

 10 General Unreserved
 2 Seating cum Luggage Rake

Traction

Both trains are hauled by a Lucknow Loco Shed-based WDM-3A diesel locomotive from Farrukhabad to Kasganj and vice versa.

See also 

 Farrukhabad Junction railway station
 Kasganj Junction railway station
 Kanpur Central–Kasganj Express

Notes

References

External links 

 15039/Farrukhabad–Kasganj Express India Rail Info
 15040/Kasganj–Farrukhabad Express India Rail Info

Express trains in India
Rail transport in Uttar Pradesh
Kasganj
Transport in Farrukhabad